Like a Boss is a 2020 American comedy film directed by Miguel Arteta, written by Sam Pitman and Adam Cole-Kelly, and starring Tiffany Haddish, Rose Byrne, and Salma Hayek. The plot follows two friends who attempt to take back control of their cosmetics company from an industry titan.

The film was theatrically released in the United States on January 10, 2020, by Paramount Pictures. The film received negative reviews from critics, though the cast received praise.

Plot 
Two friends with very different personalities run their own beauty company, Mia&Mel. Mel is more practical and inventive, while Mia wants to earn her fortune quickly and live a lavish lifestyle.

Things take a turn for the worse when their company runs into $493,000 of debt, forcing them to turn to unscrupulous benefactor Claire Luna, head of a major cosmetics empire, who intends to steal the business out from under them. The two must address their differences to save their business, as they are faced with the challenge of proving themselves to Luna even as she steals their 'one-night-stand' bag idea and has it marketed through one of her other companies, as well as forcing them to fire one of their workers, Barrett, leaving fellow staffer Sydney as their sole employee.

Mia and Mel briefly 'split up' through their different approaches to Luna's offer, but they reconcile when their friends help them face how they need each other. Faced with the possible loss of their business, Mia and Mel approach Shay, Luna's former business partner, to start a new company, Proud Cosmetics, marketing their new 'Ride or Die' product, make-up intended to be used by best friends together to face their nights out. With this loophole, Mia and Mel can produce and market 'Ride or Die' under the 'Proud' banner while Luna takes ownership of Mia&Mel while still being required to pay them 49% of all subsequent earnings. Mia and Mel also bring along Sydney and Barrett to the new company.

Cast 
 Tiffany Haddish as Mia Carter, a co-owner of Mel & Mia's, with a brash personality.
 Rose Byrne as Mel Paige, a co-owner of Mel & Mia's, who is more business-savvy, but lacks the confidence of her partner.
 Salma Hayek as Claire Luna, a cosmetics mogul who obtains a controlling share of Mel & Mia's while bailing out the owners. She plans to steal their innovative new product ideas for herself.
 Jennifer Coolidge as Sydney, Mel and Mia's employee
 Billy Porter as Barrett, Mel and Mia's employee
 Karan Soni as Josh Tinker, Claire's right-hand man
 Natasha Rothwell as Jill, Mel and Mia's friend
 Jessica St. Clair as Kim, Mel and Mia's friend
 Ari Graynor as Angela, Mel and Mia's friend
 Jimmy O. Yang as Ron
 Ryan Hansen as Greg
 Jacob Latimore as Harry
 Lisa Kudrow as Shay Whitmore
 Veronica Merrell as Lola
 Vanessa Merrell as Layla
 Caroline Arapoglou as Brook
 Seth Rollins as Byron

Production 
On October 23, 2017, it was announced that Paramount Pictures had bought a female-centered comedy spec, Limited Partners, specifically as a starring role for Tiffany Haddish. The film was written by Sam Pitman & Adam Cole-Kelly, from a story by the two, and Danielle Sanchez-Witzel, and was produced by Peter Principato, Itay Reiss, and Joel Zadak through their Principato-Young Entertainment. In July 2018, Paramount set Miguel Arteta as director. Later the same month, Rose Byrne was cast as the film's other lead. In September 2018, Salma Hayek was added to play the villain. In October 2018, Ari Graynor, Jacob Latimore, Karan Soni, Jimmy O. Yang, Natasha Rothwell, Jessica St. Clair and Billy Porter also joined the cast of the film.

Principal photography on the film began in October 2018. In July 2019, the film was re-titled Like a Boss.

Release 
Like a Boss was released on January 10, 2020 by Paramount Pictures. It was previously scheduled for June 28, 2019.

Reception

Box office
Like a Boss grossed $22.2 million in the United States and Canada, and $7.5 million in other territories, for a worldwide total of $29.7 million.

In the United States and Canada, the film was released alongside Underwater and the expansions of Just Mercy and 1917, and was projected to gross $10–12 million from 3,078 theaters in its opening weekend. The film made $3.9 million on its first day of release, including $1 million from Thursday night previews. It went on to debut to $10 million, finishing fifth at the box office. The film fell 60% in its second weekend to $4 million (and $4.7 million over the four-day Martin Luther King Jr. Day holiday), finishing ninth.

Critical response
The site's critics consensus reads, "Like a Boss oversees a merger of powerful comedic talents, but the end results are likely to leave audience members feeling swindled out of their investments." On Metacritic, the film has a weighted average score of 33 out of 100 based on 31 critics, indicating "generally unfavorable reviews." Audiences polled by CinemaScore gave the film an average grade of "B" on an A+ to F scale, and PostTrak reported viewers gave it an average 3 out of 5 stars.

Rolling Stone’s Peter Travers gave the film 1 out of 5 stars and wrote, "What we have here is a comedy on life support, with Haddish and Byrne valiantly performing futile acts of resuscitation. Sorry to report: The patient died."

References

External links 
 

American female buddy films
2020 comedy films
2020 films
2020s female buddy films
Films directed by Miguel Arteta
Films scored by Christophe Beck
Paramount Pictures films
Films set in Atlanta
Films shot in Atlanta
Films scored by Jake Monaco
2020s feminist films
2020s English-language films
2020s American films